"These Days" is the third single of Australian pop group Bardot, released in August 2000 on the back of their first national tour. It debuted and peaked at No. 19 on the Australian ARIA Singles Chart and was certified gold. It was the 100th-highest-selling single in Australia of 2000. The single was available in two unique formats. CD 1 contains live tracks from their Sydney shows as well as an enhanced component featuring the "These Days" music clip, a screensaver and gallery. CD 2 is a remix disc. Bardot performed "These Days" at the 2000 ARIA Awards where the group was nominated for three awards.

Music video
The "These Days" music video begins with a dark opening sequence, featuring Katie Underwood in a gloomy hotel, washing her face in the bathroom. It then crosses to the five girls on a sunny beach with friends. The second verse features Belinda Chapple singing on the hotel balcony while the middle 8 features Sally in the bedroom. The clip ends with the five girls with a group of friends surrounding a fire on the beach during the night.

Track listings
Australian CD1 (8573848732)
 "These Days" (album version)
 "These Days" 
 "Holding On" 
 "Higher Than Heaven" 
 CD Rom component (featuring photos, "These Days" music video and screen saver)

Australian CD2 – The Remixes (8573849122)
 "These Days"  (album version)
 "These Days" 
 "These Days" 
 "These Days" 
 "These Days"

Personnel
Credits are adapted from the Australian CD1 liner notes.
 Bardot – vocals
 Bruce Reid – guitars
 Michael Szumowski – keyboards, programming
 Colin Campsie, Phil Thornalley – writing
 Tommy Faragher – production, mixing
 The Rockmelons – production
 David Hemming – mixing, engineering
 Danielle McWilliam – engineering assistant
 Vlado Meller – mastering
 Kevin Wilkins – art direction

Charts

Weekly charts

Year-end charts

Certifications

Jennifer Paige cover

"These Days" was covered in 2001 by Jennifer Paige and was released as the first single from her second studio album, Positively Somewhere (2001). This song became a minor hit in some parts of Europe, most notably in Italy where it reached number 31.

Track listings
Japanese maxi-CD single
 "These Days"
 "Stay the Night"
 "You Get Through"

German maxi-CD single
 "These Days" (US album mix)
 "These Days" (Tommy D mix)
 "You Get Through"

Charts

References

2000 singles
2000 songs
Bardot (Australian band) songs
Jennifer Paige songs
Songs written by Colin Campsie
Songs written by Phil Thornalley
Victor Entertainment singles
Warner Music Group singles